Herbert Barrett Kelly (June 4, 1892 – May 18, 1973) was a Major League Baseball pitcher who played with the Pittsburgh Pirates in  and .

External links

1892 births
1973 deaths
Major League Baseball pitchers
Notre Dame Fighting Irish baseball players
Baseball players from Alabama
Sportspeople from Mobile, Alabama
Pittsburgh Pirates players
Johnson City Soldiers players
Atlanta Crackers players
Portland Beavers players
New Orleans Pelicans (baseball) players